The College of Arts and Sciences (CoAS) is one of the many colleges at Drexel University. It was formed in 1990 when Drexel merged the two existing College of Sciences and College of Humanities together.

History
Founded in 1891 as the Drexel Institute of Art, Science and Industry. In 1914, the School of Engineering employed full professors for English, mathematics, and chemistry.  The College of Science was created in 1968 and the College of Humanities and Social Sciences was created in 1970.

In 1990 the present-day College of Arts and Science was created from a combination of the College of Science and the College of Humanities and Social Sciences.  This consolidation was mainly a result of a downturn in enrollments and fiscal shortfalls at the time.  After the merger with MCP/Hahnemann in 2002, several departments within the college were reorganized, which resulted in the creation of the Department of Psychology, the Department of Culture and Communication, and the Department of English and Philosophy.  In addition, Computer Science was separated from the Department of Mathematics and Computer Science and moved to the College of Engineering and the School of Education was separated from the College of Arts and Sciences.

Present
The current structure of the college is made up of fourteen departments and one interdisciplinary major program that interact with each other as well as with a broad array of units throughout the university.  The college's level of involvement in teaching across the university is exhibited by the fact that the college teaches approximately 35% of the total student credit hours of the university each year.  The college employs over 300 faculty with research expenditures exceeding $4.6 million.  At the undergraduate level, the college has 19 majors (BS, BA) as well as several minor and dual-degree programs.  At the graduate level, the college has nine PhD. programs and 12 MS programs.

The CoAS offers majors and minors in 26 different areas of study and is the home of MAYA, Drexel's literary magazine. Students also have the opportunity for e-Learning an internet based learning opportunity involving different mediums such as online discussions, WebCT, and PowerPoint presentations.

Degrees Offered
The College of Arts and Sciences offers 20 majors, 8 accelerated degrees, 6 certificates, 9 intermediate proficiency certificates, and 38 minors.

 Majors
 Anthropology (BA)
 Biological Sciences (BS)
 Chemistry (BA, BS)
 Chemistry-Biochemistry Concentration (BS)
 Communication (BA, BS)
 Criminology and Justice Studies (BS)
 English (BA)
 Environmental Sciences (BS)
 Environmental Studies (BS)
 Environmental Studies and Sustainability (BA)
 Geoscience (BS)
 Global Studies (BA)
 History (BA)
 Mathematics (BA, BS)
 Philosophy (BA)
 Physics (BS)
 Political Science (BA)
 Psychology (BS)
 Sociology (BA)
 Accelerated Degrees
 Anthropology (BA) / Science, Technology & Society (MS)
 Anthropology (BA/BS) / Law (JD)
 Biological Scienced (BS) / Biology (MS)
 Biological Sciences (BA/BS) / Medicine (MD)
 Chemistry (BS) / Chemistry (MS)
 Chemistry (BA/BS) / Medicine (MD)
 Chemistry (BA/BS) / Law (JD)
 English (BA) / Publishing (MA)
 History (BA) / Library and Information Science (MSLIS)
 History (BA) / Science, Technology & Society (MS)
 Philosophy (BA) / Public Policy (MS)
 Philosophy (BA) / Science, Technology & Society (MS)
 Political Science (BA) / Science, Technology & Society (MS)
 Sociology (BA) / Science, Technology & Society (MS)
 Certificates
 Ethical Theory and Practice
 Interfaith and Religious Studies
 Medical Humanities
 Philosophy, Arts, and Humanities
 Philosophy, Science & Technology
 Writing and Publishing
 Intermediate Proficiency Certificates
 Arabic
 Chinese
 French
 German
 Hebrew
 Italian
 Japanese
 Korean
 Spanish

 Minors
 Africana Studies
 Anthropology
 Arabic
 Astrophysics
 Bioinformatics
 Biological Sciences
 Biophysics
 Bioscience and Society
 Chemistry
 Chinese
 Communication
 Computer Crime
 Criminal Justice
 Ecology
 English
 Environmental Studies
 French
 Geoscience
 German
 Global Studies
 History
 Human Factors and Ergonomics
 Italian Studies
 Japanese
 Judaic Studies
 Korean
 Mathematics
 Neuroscience
 Nonprofit Communication
 Philosophy
 Physics
 Politics
 Psychology
 Science, Technology & Society
 Sociology
 Spanish
 Women's and Gender Studies
 Writing

References

Sources
College of Arts and Sciences: About CoAS
Drexel University Catalog: The College of Arts and Sciences

Drexel University
Educational institutions established in 1990
1990 establishments in Pennsylvania
Liberal arts colleges at universities in the United States